is a Japanese voice actor from Kanagawa Prefecture who is affiliated with I'm Enterprise. He is known for his roles as Chrome in Dr. Stone, Rintarō Futsu in Stars Align, Fumiya Tomozaki in Bottom-tier Character Tomozaki, and Sōsaku Yubiwa in Pretty Boy Detective Club.

Biography
Satō became interested in pursuing a career in voice acting during his third year of junior high school, after watching the anime series Star Driver. His family was not opposed to his decision provided that he also pursue college studies. While in university, he enrolled at the Japan Narration Actor Institute. Following his training, he passed an audition held by the talent agency I'm Enterprise and became formally affiliated with them in 2017.

In 2019, Satō was cast as the character Chrome in the anime television series Dr. Stone, and as Rintarō Futsu in Stars Align. In 2021, he played the roles of Fumiya Tomozaki in Bottom-tier Character Tomozaki and Tomoyuki Kubota in Skate-Leading Stars. In 2022, he played the roles of Ko Yamori in Call of the Night and Ichibanboshi in Shine On! Bakumatsu Bad Boys!. Satō was one of the winners of the Best New Actor Award at the 16th Seiyu Awards.

Filmography

Anime
2018
Gundam Build Divers, Diver
Golden Kamuy, Soldier (episode 1)
Seven Senses of the Reunion, Adventurer, Player
Cells at Work!, Red Blood Cell
Persona 5: The Animation
A Certain Magical Index III, Citizen (episode 3); Knight C (episode 12)
Bloom Into You, Male student (episodes 2, 4)
As Miss Beelzebub Likes, Purson

2019
Endro!, Warrior
That Time I Got Reincarnated as a Slime, Gale Gibson
Sword Art Online: Alicization, Player
Dr. Stone, Chrome
Stars Align, Rintarō Futsu

2020
King's Raid: Successors of the Will, Tam

2021
Bottom-tier Character Tomozaki, Fumiya Tomozaki
Skate-Leading Stars, Tomoyuki Kubota
Dr. Stone: Stone Wars, Chrome
Burning Kabaddi, Sōma Azemachi
Pretty Boy Detective Club, Sо̄saku Yubiwa
Fena: Pirate Princess, Enju
Amaim Warrior at the Borderline, Amō Shiiba
JoJo's Bizarre Adventure: Stone Ocean, Pi-Chan

2022
Shine On! Bakumatsu Bad Boys!, Ichibanboshi
Call of the Night, Ko Yamori
Lucifer and the Biscuit Hammer, Mikazuki Shinonome
Bibliophile Princess, Alan Ferrera

2023
High Card, Finn Oldman
Heavenly Delusion, Maru
Insomniacs After School, Ganta
Rokudō no Onna-tachi, Tōsuke Rokudō
The Dangers in My Heart, Kenta Kanzaki

TBA
Tales of Wedding Rings, Satou
Uzumaki, Boy 1

Video games
2021
Jack Jeanne, Sōshirō Yonaga
Fire Emblem Heroes, Saul

References

External links
Agency profile 

1997 births
21st-century Japanese male actors
I'm Enterprise voice actors
Japanese male video game actors
Japanese male voice actors
Living people
Male voice actors from Kanagawa Prefecture
Seiyu Award winners